John E. Jones may refer to:

John E. Jones (Medal of Honor) (1834–?), American Civil War recipient of the Medal of Honor
John E. Jones III (born 1955), U.S. federal judge for the Middle District of Pennsylvania
John Edward Jones (sculptor) (1806–1862), Irish sculptor
John Edward Jones (Welsh politician) (1905–1970), Welsh political organiser
John Edward Jones (governor) (1840–1896), Welsh-born governor of Nevada
John Edward Jones (1983-2009), caver who died in the Nutty Putty Cave
John Elfed Jones (born 1933), Welsh businessman and language activist